A medical procedure is a course of action intended to achieve a result in the delivery of healthcare.

A medical procedure with the intention of determining, measuring, or diagnosing a patient condition or parameter is also called a medical test. Other common kinds of procedures are therapeutic (i.e., intended to treat, cure, or restore function or structure), such as surgical and physical rehabilitation procedures.

Definition
"An activity directed at or performed on an individual with the object of improving health, treating disease or injury, or making a diagnosis." - International Dictionary of Medicine and Biology
"The act or conduct of diagnosis, treatment, or operation." - Stedman's Medical Dictionary by Thomas Lathrop Stedman
"A series of steps by which a desired result is accomplished." - Dorland's Medical Dictionary by William Alexander Newman Dorland
"The sequence of steps to be followed in establishing some course of action." - Mosby's Medical, Nursing, & Allied Health Dictionary

List of medical procedures

Propaedeutic
 Auscultation
 Medical inspection (body features)
 Palpation
 Percussion (medicine)
 Vital signs measurement, such as blood pressure, body temperature, or pulse (or heart rate)

Diagnostic
 Lab tests
 Biopsy test
 Blood test
 Stool test
 Urinalysis
 Cardiac stress test
 Electrocardiography
 Electrocorticography
 Electroencephalography
 Electromyography
 Electroneuronography
 Electronystagmography
 Electrooculography
 Electroretinography
 Endoluminal capsule monitoring
 Endoscopy
 Colonoscopy
 Colposcopy
 Cystoscopy
 Gastroscopy
 Laparoscopy
 Laryngoscopy
 Ophthalmoscopy
 Otoscopy
 Sigmoidoscopy
 Esophageal motility study
 Evoked potential
 Magnetoencephalography
 Medical imaging
 Angiography
 Aortography
 Cerebral angiography
 Coronary angiography
 Lymphangiography
 Pulmonary angiography
 Ventriculography
 Chest photofluorography
 Computed tomography
 Echocardiography
 Electrical impedance tomography
 Fluoroscopy
 Magnetic resonance imaging
 Diffuse optical imaging
 Diffusion tensor imaging
 Diffusion-weighted imaging
 Functional magnetic resonance imaging
 Positron emission tomography
 Radiography
 Scintillography
 SPECT
 Ultrasonography
 Contrast-enhanced ultrasound
 Gynecologic ultrasonography
 Intravascular ultrasound
 Obstetric ultrasonography
 Thermography
 Virtual colonoscopy
 Neuroimaging
 Posturography

Therapeutic

 Thrombosis prophylaxis
 Precordial thump
 Politzerization
 Hemodialysis
 Hemofiltration
 Plasmapheresis
 Apheresis
 Extracorporeal membrane oxygenation (ECMO)
 Cancer immunotherapy
 Cancer vaccine
 Cervical conization
 Chemotherapy
 Cytoluminescent therapy
 Insulin potentiation therapy
 Low-dose chemotherapy
 Monoclonal antibody therapy
 Photodynamic therapy
 Radiation therapy
 Targeted therapy
 Tracheal intubation
 Unsealed source radiotherapy
 Virtual reality therapy
 Physical therapy/Physiotherapy
 Speech therapy
 Phototerapy
 Hydrotherapy
 Heat therapy
 Shock therapy
 Insulin shock therapy
 Electroconvulsive therapy
 Symptomatic treatment
 Fluid replacement therapy
 Palliative care
 Hyperbaric oxygen therapy
 Oxygen therapy
 Gene therapy
 Enzyme replacement therapy
 Intravenous therapy
 Phage therapy
 Respiratory therapy
 Vision therapy
 Electrotherapy
 Transcutaneous electrical nerve stimulation (TENS)
 Laser therapy
 Combination therapy
 Occupational therapy
 Immunization
 Vaccination
 Immunosuppressive therapy
 Psychotherapy
 Drug therapy
 Acupuncture
 Antivenom
 Magnetic therapy
 Craniosacral therapy
 Chelation therapy
 Hormonal therapy
 Hormone replacement therapy
 Opiate replacement therapy
 Cell therapy
 Stem cell treatments
 Intubation
 Nebulization
 Inhalation therapy
 Particle therapy
 Proton therapy
 Fluoride therapy
 Cold compression therapy
 Animal-Assisted Therapy
 Negative Pressure Wound Therapy
 Nicotine replacement therapy
 Oral rehydration therapy

Surgical
 Ablation
 Amputation
 Biopsy
 Cardiopulmonary resuscitation (CPR)
 Cryosurgery
 Endoscopic surgery
 Facial rejuvenation
 General surgery
 Hand surgery
 Hemilaminectomy
 Image-guided surgery
 Knee cartilage replacement therapy
 Laminectomy
 Laparoscopic surgery
 Lithotomy
 Lithotriptor
 Lobotomy
 Neovaginoplasty
 Radiosurgery
 Stereotactic surgery
 Radiosurgery
 Vaginoplasty
 Xenotransplantation

Anesthesia
 Dissociative anesthesia
 General anesthesia
 Local anesthesia
Topical anesthesia (surface)
Epidural (extradural) block
Spinal anesthesia (subarachnoid block)
 Regional anesthesia

Other
 Interventional radiology
 Screening (medicine)

See also
 Algorithm (medical)
 Autopsy
 Complication (medicine)
 Consensus (medical)
 Contraindication
 Course (medicine)
 Drug interaction
 Extracorporeal
 Guideline (medical)
 Iatrogenesis
 Invasive (medical)
 List of surgical instruments
 Medical error
 Medical prescription
 Medical test
 Minimally invasive
 Nocebo
 Non-invasive
 Physical examination
 Responsible drug use
 Surgical instruments
 Vital signs

References

Medical terminology
Medical treatments